Kevin Eadie is a professional rugby league footballer who played in the 2000s. He played at club level for Stanley Rangers ARLFC, Featherstone Rovers (Heritage № 907), and Doncaster.

Playing career
Kevin Eadie made his début for Featherstone Rovers on Sunday 3 February 2008.

References

External links
Search for "Eadie" at rugbyleagueproject.org
Stanley Rangers ARLFC - Roll of Honour

Living people
Doncaster R.L.F.C. players
English rugby league players
Featherstone Rovers players
Place of birth missing (living people)
Year of birth missing (living people)